Mikhaylovsky District is an administrative and municipal district (raion), one of the twenty-five in Ryazan Oblast, Russia. It is located in the west of the oblast. Its administrative center is the town of Mikhaylov. Population: 35,223 (2010 Census);  The population of Mikhaylov accounts for 33.5% of the district's total population.

References

Notes

Sources

Districts of Ryazan Oblast